The men's 100 metres T42 took place in Stadium Australia.

There were two heats and one final round. The T42 is for athletes who have an amputation below the knee.

Heats

Heat 1

Heat 2

Final round

References

Athletics at the 2000 Summer Paralympics